Scottish Fuels is a distributor of fuel oil products and petrol within Scotland.  It was formed in 2001 following the transfer of local assets from BP. Scottish Fuels is based in Falkirk and is owned by DCC plc, an Irish company.

References

External links
Official website

Oil and gas companies of Scotland
Companies based in Falkirk (council area)
Energy companies established in 2001
2001 establishments in Scotland